Joseph Johnson (born 1903) was an English professional footballer who played as an inside right.

Career
Born in Liverpool, Johnson signed for Bradford City in May 1927 from Scunthorpe United, leaving the club in 1928. During his time with Bradford City he made one appearance in the Football League, scoring one goal.

Sources

References

1903 births
Date of death missing
English footballers
Scunthorpe United F.C. players
Bradford City A.F.C. players
English Football League players
Association football inside forwards